The Agua de la Piedra Formation (FAP, Spanish names include Estratos de Agua de la Piedra and Complejo Volcano-sedimentario del Terciario inferior) is a Late Oligocene (Deseadan in the SALMA classification) geologic formation of the Malargüe Group that crops out in the southernmost Precordillera and northernmost Neuquén Basin in southern Mendoza Province, Argentina.

The strictly terrestrial tuffs and paleosols of the formation, geologically belonging to Patagonia, have provided a wealth of mammal fossils of various groups at Quebrada Fiera, including Mendozahippus fierensis, Pyrotherium, Coniopternium and Fieratherium. Terror birds reminiscent of the terror bird Andrewsornis and indeterminate remains of the phorusrhacid family have found in conjunction with the mammals.

Regional geology 
The Agua de la Piedra is geologically part of the Neuquén Basin, Argentina's most prolific onshore petroleum producing basin of northwestern Patagonia, and crops out in the geographical feature of the Andean orogeny; the Argentinian Precordillera of the higher Andes in the hinterland. The Malargüe Group, of which the Agua de la Piedra Formation is the uppermost unit, hosts among the most spectacular dinosaur fossils and nesting sites in the Allen Formation, the lowermost stratigraphic unit of the group.

The Jagüel Formation, overlying the Allen Formation, hosts the Cretaceous–Paleogene boundary and has provided fossils of marine reptiles including mosasaurs and the marine turtle Euclastes meridionalis. The Roca Formation, overlying the Jagüel Formation shows evidence of Atlantic waters depositing the evaporites, claystones and limestones of the formation.

The Neuquén Basin started forming in the latest Jurassic as one of the rift basins resulting from the break-up of Pangea. While the earlier formations in the basin are mostly distal terrestrial in nature, the Agua de la Piedra Formation is a unique combination of purely terrestrial influence (paleosols) with the early Andean volcanism in the form of tuffs.

Oligocene South America

Climate 

Oligocene South America differed quite substantially from the Eocene period preceding it. Isolated from Gondwana for 70 million years, the continent had developed widespread lush forests with their own specific faunas. The climate drastically cooled at the Eocene-Oligocene boundary with global cooling as a result of the formation of the Antarctic Ocean current. The South American landscape became more arid than in the Eocene with ongoing volcanism related to the Andean orogeny affecting the local climates.

Oligocene fauna 
The Oligocene of South America is characterized by the arrival of the first monkeys, possibly rafting from Africa, which in the Oligocene was significantly removed from South America. The first rodents had arrived to the island continent in the Late Eocene before, perhaps using similar methods of transoceanic transport. The rodents of South America diversified in the Oligocene. Cabeza Blanca, where the Sarmiento Formation outcrops, has provided the richest and most diverse Oligocene fauna of South America.

The cooler Oligocene climate led to the wide-spread extension of savanna and other grassland biomes. In the Early Oligocene, these rodents inhabited open and arid landscapes with wind-blown dust and grasslands environments.

Monkeys and rodents 
The oldest confirmed New World monkey fossils stem from the Deseadan formations Salla in presently Andean Bolivia (the approximately  weighing Branisella boliviana and Szalatavus attricuspis half the size of Branisella) and the  heavy Canaanimico from the Chambira of Amazonian Peru.

The rodents had arrived in the Late Eocene and diversified greatly during the Deseadan following the appearance of Andemys with species A. frassinettii and A. termasi in the Tinguirirican (Abanico Formation; Tinguiririca fauna). Caviomorphs arrived in Patagonia during the latest Eocene or early Oligocene, and
by the Late Oligocene they were highly diversified, with representatives of the four main lineages. A great morphological disparity, at least in tooth morphology, was then acquired mainly by the development of hypsodonty in several lineages. The early evolution of each of the major clades was complex, especially for chinchilloids and octodontoids. The first stages of the evolution of cavioids are more obscure because they are recognized through the relatively derived Deseadan species of Cavioidea.

The Oligocene (Tinguirirican and Deseadan SALMAs plus La Cantera fauna) has a rich record of caviomorphs showing a greater morphological disparity than older faunas. Representatives of the four superfamilies, with the archetypal dental features that characterize species of the subsequent SALMAs, can be clearly recognized, at least since the Deseadan SALMA. Although a few genera (e.g., Andemys, Branisamys) cannot be assigned with certainty to any supra generic taxa. The Acaremyidae were likely a group of austral differentiation. The first representatives, the Deseadan Platypittamys brachyodon, Galileomys baios and Changquin woodi, attest to its differentiation into several lineages.

Oligocene volcanism 

Early Andean volcanism in the Southern Cone of South America dating to the Oligocene has been found in:

 Estratos de Pupunahue
 Estratos de San Pedro
 Caleta Chonos Formation
 Cheuquemó Formation
 Temuco Formation
 Oxaya Formation
 Ancud Volcanic Complex
 Cerro Ratones

Description 
The formation comprises the "Rodados Lustrosos" level, formed by clastic heterogeneous conglomerates in a silty matrix, considered as the stratigraphic evidence of the Pehuenche orogenic phase of the Andean orogeny, followed by uniform sequences, variable in thickness, of whitish-ocher tuffaceous paleosols with concretions and whitish-gray tuffs with intercalations of pyroclastic deposits.

The formation overlies the Pircala-Coihueco Formation.

Depositional environment 
The studied profiles of the Agua de la Piedra Formation show large lateral lithological varieties, typical of alluvial fan depositional setings. The climate during deposition has been estimated to be semi-arid and the differential thicknesses of facies associations within the Agua de la Piedra Formation may represent the infill of minibasins in the forming foreland of the Andes. Sedimentary loading can enhance the effect of tectonic forces in foreland basins. The variety in volcanic fragments and composition indicates local ash fall caused by contemporaneous volcanism in the area of deposition.

2017 research on the Deseadan fauna (late Oligocene) from Quebrada Fiera, south of Mendoza Province, Argentina, evidences a rich mammal assemblage that shows the existence of common elements with Deseadan faunal associations of Patagonia and those of lower latitudes such as Salla, Bolivia, as well as endemic taxa of different groups.

Endemism refers to Notohippidae (Mendozahippus fierensis), Leontiniidae (Gualta cuyana), Homalodotheriidae (Asmodeus petrasnerus) and Metatheria
(Fieratherium sorex); to these mammals a new terrestrial snail has been added in 2016.

Faunal data published in 2019 confirm the Deseadan age, but as per 2020, absolute dating is lacking for Quebrada Fiera.

Paleontological significance

Quebrada Fiera 
The Quebrada Fiera site is situated in the Malargüe Department, southern Mendoza Province, Argentina, in the foothills of the Andes Range. The site was discovered during a geological prospection carried out by Yacimientos Petrolíferos Fiscales (YPF) in the late 1970s (Gorroño et al., 1979).

The site is one of five recognized fossiliferous sites in Mendoza Province, with Divisadero Largo, where the Santacrucian Mariño Formarion is found, Huaquerías, defining the Huayquerian in the Huayquerías Formation, the Aisol Formation of central Mendoza and the Uspallata Group and Carrizal Formations in the north of the province.

The geological characterization and the preliminary faunal list were published by Gorroño et al. (1979). The faunal assemblage was then assigned to the Late Oligocene (Deseadan SALMA) based on the presence of two typical representatives of the Deseadean fauna of Patagonia; Pyrotherium  and Proborhyaena gigantea , both also found in the Puesto Almendra member of the Sarmiento Formation.

The species epithet Mendozahippus fierensis and genus Fieratherium refer to Quebrada Fiera.

Fossil content 
The formation has provided fossils of:

SALMA correlations 

The Deseadan South American land mammal age (SALMA) is equivalent to the Arikareean in the North American land mammal age (NALMA) and the Harrisonian in the 2000 version of the classification. It overlaps with the Hsandagolian of Asia and the MP 25 zone of Europe, the Waitakian and the Landon epoch of New Zealand.

See also 

 Abanico Formation
 Dos Bocas Formation
 Collón Curá Formation
 Gaiman Formation
 Honda Group
 Itaboraí Formation
 Ituzaingó Formation
 Laguna del Hunco Formation
 Deseadan formations

References

Bibliography 

General
 
 

Regional geology
 
 
  
 
  
  
 
 

Oligocene volcanism
 
 
 
 
  
 
 
 

Paleontology
   Material was copied from this source, which is available under a Creative Commons Attribution 3.0 International License.
 
 
 
   Material was copied from this source, which is available under a Creative Commons Attribution 4.0 International License.
 
 
 
 
 
 
 
 
 
  
 
 
 

New World monkeys
 
 
 

Terror birds
 
    
  
  
    
  

South American rodents

Regional correlations 
Mariño Formation
 

Rancahué Formation
 
 

Río Guillermo Formation
 

Deseado Formation
 
 

Sarmiento Formation
 
 
 
 
 
 
 
 
 
 

Salla Formation
 
 
 

Lacayani fauna
 

Fray Bentos Formation
 
 

Moquegua Formation
 
 

Chambira Formation
 
 
 

Barzalosa Formation
 
 

Tremembé Formation
 
 
 

Las Cascadas Formation

Further reading 

 
    
  

Geologic formations of Argentina
Oligocene Series of South America
Paleogene Argentina
Oligocene volcanism
Chattian Stage
Deseadan
Tuff formations
Alluvial deposits
Malargüe Group
Fossiliferous stratigraphic units of South America
Paleontology in Argentina
Geology of Mendoza Province
Geology of Patagonia
Neuquén Basin